Boglárka Csemer (born 30 November 1986 in Budapest, Hungary), professionally known as Boggie, is a Hungarian pop vocalist and songwriter. Globally, Boggie is best known for her 2014 hit single entitled "Nouveau Parfum" from her self-titled debut studio album Boggie (2013). While the song went number one on Hungary's MAHASZ chart, it also found its way to two Billboard charts reaching number three on its Jazz Album Chart and number 17 on its World Music Album Chart. She represented Hungary in the Eurovision Song Contest 2015 with the song "Wars for Nothing". On 19 May 2015, her song qualified for the 2015 Eurovision Song Contest final, which was held on 23 May 2015 in Vienna, Austria.

Musical career

2014–present: Boggie era
Boggie rose to major prominence in early January 2014 after the release of the music video to her debut single "Nouveau Parfum" (French for "New Perfume"). The video was picked up by media outlets in various countries including the UK and United States. The video shows the singer being extensively retouched while she sings the song, which is a darker, French rewrite of the song's Hungarian version entitled "Parfüm". Both versions are extracted from Boglárka's self-titled debut album entitled Boggie, released in 2013. The video and its message are similar to the Body Evolution viral video created for GlobalDemocracy.com to encourage the introduction of mandatory disclaimers on retouched images in popular media. Much like the model in Body Evolution, by the end of the video Boglárka bears little resemblance to her unaltered appearance at the start. A brief split-screen comparison shows the viewer how drastically different the final result is.

Two verses in "Nouveau Parfum" consist of Boggie reeling off a list of designer label perfumes and asking which she should choose, before questioning why she should have to make a choice at all and asking who is making her choose. Boggie then counters this pressure with the lines, "Je ne suis pas leur produit / De beauté, d’préciosité / Ils ne peuvent pas me changer" ("I am not their product / Of beauty, of preciousness / They cannot change me").

"Parfüm", in contrast, does not reel off the names of thirty designer labels. Instead, the Hungarian version contains lyrics hoping to inspire the listener to set themselves free of the intoxicating yet harmful effects of all that is unnatural and unattainable: "Parfümnek varázsa, szirmoknak virága / Vágyaink kínzása, selymeknek siklása / Keletnek fűszere, buja kis meséje / Úgy elbódít / Most mind kidobom / Torz tükröm elhajítom / Kabátom szárnyra nyitom / Lélegezz szabadon" ("Perfume's magic, Petals' flowers / Torturing desires, gliding of silk / The East's spices, their lustful little tale / Dazes me so / Now I'm throwing all of them out / I'm casting my distorted mirror away / My coat opens into wings / Breathe freely"). A YouTube fan video splicing both the Hungarian and French versions together offers not only a chance to hear portions of each song, but also further shows the progress of photo manipulation into the video realm.

Reflecting the popularity of "Parfüm" and "Nouveau Perfum", a third version was also recorded by Boggie in English entitled "Perfume".

Eurovision Song Contest
Boggie represented Hungary in the Eurovision Song Contest 2015 with the song "Wars for Nothing". On 19 May 2015 she qualified for the event's grand final, which was held on 23 May 2015 in Vienna, Austria, and finished in twentieth place, receiving 19 points.

Discography

Singles

Albums

References

External links

Music video to "Parfüm" (in Hungarian) on YouTube
Music video to "Nouveau Parfum" (in French) on YouTube
Music video to "Perfume" (in English) on YouTube
Music video to "Nouveau Parfum" on Vimeo

1986 births
Eurovision Song Contest entrants of 2015
Eurovision Song Contest entrants for Hungary
21st-century Hungarian women singers
Hungarian pop singers
Living people
Musicians from Budapest